Nina Maria Nastasia (born May 13, 1966) is an American folk singer-songwriter. A native of Los Angeles, she first came to prominence in New York City in 2000 after Radio 1 disc jockey John Peel began giving her debut album, Dogs, airplay. The album earned Nastasia a cult following, and was re-released in 2004. Her fifth studio album release, You Follow Me (2007), was a collaboration with Australian drummer Jim White of Dirty Three.

, Nastasia has released a total of seven studio albums, each recorded by Steve Albini. Her musical style has been described as folk and country-influenced with neo-Gothic overtones, often featuring sparse acoustic guitar accompanied by string arrangements.

Biography
Nina Nastasia was born and raised in Hollywood, Los Angeles, California and is of Calabrian-Italian and Irish descent. As a child, she studied piano and often wrote short stories, but has said she had no aspirations of becoming a professional musician.

She began writing songs in 1993, and released her first album, Dogs, in 2000. Only 1,500 copies of the album were initially pressed, with Nastasia putting together the album packaging herself in her apartment.  Nastasia sold them at her shows, quickly selling all of them. By the end of the year 2000, the album was out of print. Famed DJ John Peel took notice of the album (calling it "astonishing") after having been given a copy by Steve Albini.  Peel began playing songs from it frequently on his radio show on BBC Radio 1. The album helped earn Nastasia a cult following.

Nastasia has released seven albums, one in collaboration with Jim White. Her first album, Dogs, was initially released in 2000 on Socialist Records. Her subsequent albums, The Blackened Air (2002) and Run to Ruin (2003), were released on indie label Touch and Go Records, which also re-released Dogs in 2004, followed by a national tour; in CMJ, music journalist Kara Zuaro reviewed a live show promoting Run to Ruin, noting: "Nastasia hearkens back to a time when chamber music was a performed as a pastime for the players, rather than a spectator sport for the blue -blooded. When an audience applauds her live performances, she and her congenial New York City-based orchestra, minus the singing saw player who left to join the circus, turn to smile at each other."

In 2006, On Leaving was released on Fat Cat Records. In 2007, an album on which she collaborated with Jim White entitled You Follow Me was released through Fat Cat. All of Nastasia's albums to date were recorded by Steve Albini, who has ardently praised her music in a number of interviews. Nastasia subsequently recorded six sessions for late BBC disc jockey John Peel's show. The last one was recorded with the help of Tuvan throat singing group Huun-Huur-Tu. Two of Nastasia's songs were included in Peel's annual Festive Fifty: "Ugly Face" (ranked 4th in 2002) and "You, Her & Me" (ranked 13th in 2003).

A 7-inch single, titled "What She Doesn't Know" was released on February 25, 2008.  The single featured the title track, along with the song "Your Red Nose".  Both tracks were recorded by Steve Albini during the On Leaving sessions.  Nastasia has called the single "a good complement to You Follow Me". A solo American and European tour coincided with the release of the single. The single "Cry, Cry, Baby" was released on May 10, 2010, internationally and May 18 in the US. Her sixth studio album, Outlaster, followed on June 7, 2010.

Nastasia disappeared from the public eye for several years. On September 24, 2017, she performed at the Electrical Audio 20th anniversary party at The Hideout Block Party in Chicago, Illinois. On December 14, 2018, she released the non-album single "Handmade Card". In October 2020, Nastasia issued a statement for her fans on Bandcamp which read: "I've been away for a long while now, but I just finished recording a new album with Steve Albini. I'm going to be working hard over the next few months to get those songs out to you and many more in the near future."

In February 2022, Nastasia signed a record deal with Temporary Residence Limited, which digitally reissued On Leaving, You Follow Me and Outlaster that same month. She appeared as the opening act for Mogwai on their US theater tour in April. Her seventh studio album, Riderless Horse, recorded by Steve Albini and Greg Norman in a cabin in upstate New York, was released on July 22, 2022.

Musical style
Nastasia's music has been noted by journalists and critics for blending elements of folk and Americana, with Gothic overtones. Her music has been likened to that of Tom Waits, Devendra Banhart, Neko Case, and Cat Power. Her songs prominently feature acoustic guitar, often with various string arrangements accompanying, including cello, violin, and viola.

Influences
Nastasia has stated in interviews that she knows little of musical history, and had not originally intended to become a musician. She has commented that she is a fan of films, particularly horror films.

Discography

Albums
 Dogs (2000; re-released 2004)
 The Blackened Air (2002)
 Run to Ruin (2003)
 On Leaving (2006)
 You Follow Me (2007) – collaboration with Jim White
 Outlaster (2010)
 Riderless Horse  (2022)

Singles and EPs
 "What She Doesn't Know" (2008)
 "Cry, Cry, Baby" (2010)
 "You Can Take Your Time" (2010)
 "Handmade Card" (2018)
 "Just Stay in Bed" (2022)
 "This Is Love" (2022)
 "Afterwards" (2022)
 "Too Soon" / "Whatever You Need to Believe" (2022)

Contributions
 2001 "I Will Never Marry", on the compilation album Comes with a Smile, Volume 3 – Pretty Together
 2005 "The Matter (of Our Discussion)", on the Boom Bip album Blue Eyed in the Red Room (Lex)
 2005 "Bird of Cuzco", song on John Peel: A Tribute compilation (WEA)
 2009 "Repulsion", on the compilation album Black and White, given free with issue No. 12 of Esopus
 2010 "Outside the Haus Tambaran", "Sand Reflection" and "Final Call" from the David Corter album Didgeridoo Dimensions
 2018 "The Poisoner" on the Daniel Knox album Chasescene

Band members

References

External links

1966 births
Living people
American folk singers
American folk guitarists
American people of Italian descent
American people of Irish descent
Guitarists from Los Angeles
People from Hollywood, Los Angeles
Singers from Los Angeles
Touch and Go Records artists
FatCat Records artists
20th-century American guitarists
20th-century American women guitarists
Singer-songwriters from California
21st-century American women